Merrill Creek is a creek in the Moira River and Lake Ontario drainage basins in Hastings and Lennox and Addington Counties, Ontario, Canada.

Course
It heads south into Little Merrill Lake, then southwest to Whitefish Lake. Partridge Creek flows via the Skootamatta River and Moira River to the Bay of Quinte on Lake Ontario at Belleville.

See also
List of rivers of Ontario

References

Rivers of Hastings County
Rivers of Lennox and Addington County